Cyril Brown (25 May 1918 – 15 April 1990) was an English professional footballer who played as an inside forward in the Football League for Notts County and Rochdale.

Career statistics

References

1918 births
1990 deaths
Sportspeople from Ashington
Footballers from Northumberland
Association football inside forwards
English footballers
English Football League players
Felixstowe & Walton United F.C. players
Brentford F.C. players
Sunderland A.F.C. players
Notts County F.C. players
Boston United F.C. players
Rochdale A.F.C. players
Midland Football League players

Peterborough United F.C. players